A shi'b in Arabic is a "gorge" or "canyon" for a usually (stationary or temporary) dry river. Placenames using the word are common in the Arabic peninsula.

Saudi Arabia
 Shi‘b adh Dhi’b
 Ash Shi`b
 Shi`b `amir

Yemen
 Ash Shiʽb al-Aswad
 Shiʽb an-Nur
 Shiʿb Hūd

Landforms